Aedeomyia is a genus of flies belonging to the family Culicidae.

Some species of this genus are found in the Southern Hemisphere.

Species
Aedeomyia africana Neveu-Lemaire, 1906
Aedeomyia catasticta Knab, 1909
Aedeomyia furfurea (Enderlein, 1923)
Aedeomyia madagascarica Brunhes, Boussès & Ramos, 2011
Aedeomyia pauliani Grjebine, 1953
Aedeomyia squamipennis (Lynch Arribalzaga, 1878)
Aedeomyia venustipes (Skuse, 1889)

References

Culicidae
Diptera of Africa
Diptera of Asia
Taxa named by Frederick Vincent Theobald